Kencho Tobgay (born 11 October 1991) is a Bhutanese professional footballer. He made his first appearance for the Bhutan national football team in 2016.

References

Bhutanese footballers
Bhutan international footballers
Living people
1991 births
People from Thimphu
Association football midfielders